Gladys Bagg Taber (1899–1980), author of 59 books, including the Stillmeadow books, and columnist for Ladies' Home Journal and Family Circle.

Biography
Gladys Bagg Taber was born in Colorado Springs on April 12, 1899, and spent most of her early years moving because of her father's work as a mining engineer. She lived in New Mexico, California, Illinois and Wisconsin, and spent time on her grandfather's farm in Massachusetts. In 1920, she received a bachelor's degree from Wellesley, and an M.A. from Lawrence College in 1921. She married Frank Taber, and they had a daughter, Constance, which interrupted her academic career; then for more than 20 years, she lived in Stillmeadow, her vintage 1690 Southbury, Connecticut, farmhouse, having commuted to New York City part of the time to teach creative writing at Columbia University from 1921 to 1926. The house was jointly owned by the Tabers and their friends Eleanor and Max Mayer.  Her column "Diary of Domesticity" began in the Ladies' Home Journal in November 1937; "Butternut Wisdom" ran in the Family Circle from 1959 to 1967.

Gladys Taber lived in Stillmeadow, a 1690 farmhouse off Jeremy Swamp Road in Southbury, starting in 1933 (summers only) and 1935 (full-time). She died on March 11, 1980.

Bibliography
1925/8 Lady of the Moon
1929 Lyonnesse
1934 Late Climbs the Sun
1935 Tomorrow May Be Fair
1937 The Evergreen Tree
1938 Long Tails and Short
1938 A Star to Steer By
1938 This Is For Always
1940 Harvest at Stillmeadow
1944 The Heart Has April Too
1944 Give Us This Day
1944 Nurse in Blue
1945/9 Especially Spaniels
1945 Give Me the Stars
1946 The Family on Maple Street
1947/8 Flower Arranging for the American Home
1947/51 Stillmeadow Kitchen
1948 The Book of Stillmeadow
1948 Daisy and Dobbin, Two Little Seahorses
1949 Especially Father
1949 The First Book of Dogs
1950 The First Book of Cats
1950 Stillmeadow Seasons
1952 When Dogs Meet People
1953 Stillmeadow and Sugarbridge
1955 Stillmeadow Daybook
1957 Mrs. Daffodil
1958 What Cooks at Stillmeadow
1959 Spring Harvest
1959 Stillmeadow Sampler
1962 The Stillmeadow Road
1963 Another Path
1965 Stillmeadow Cook Book
1966 One Dozen and One
1967 Stillmeadow Calendar
1968 Especially Dogs
1969 A Book to Begin on Flower Arranging
1969 Stillmeadow Album
1970 Amber, A Very Personal Cat
1970 Reveries at Stillmeadow
1971 My Own Cape Cod
1972 My Own Cook Book
1974 Country Chronicle
1976 Harvest of Yesterdays
1976 The Best of Stillmeadow
1977 Letters of Inspiration
1978 Conversations With Amber
1981 Still Cove Journal

References

External links
 Friends of Gladys Taber website
 "Butternut Wisdom": A Tribute to Gladys Taber and Stillmeadow
 Susan Branch: Gladys Taber Fan Club

1899 births
1980 deaths
20th-century American writers
20th-century American women writers